The 2015 Gent–Wevelgem in Flanders Fields was a women's one-day road cycling race held in Belgium on 29 March 2015. The race was rated as a 1.2 category race, and was won by Dutch rider Floortje Mackaij. Mackaij escaped in the last three kilometres from a front group of three riders and was not pulled back by the others. Janneke Ensing was second ahead of Chloe Hosking, while Jolien D'Hoore won the sprint for fourth.

Results

See also
 2015 in women's road cycling

References

Gent-Wevelgem Women's race
Gent-Wevelgem Women's race
Women's road bicycle races
Gent–Wevelgem